A referendum on the Islamisation policy of President Muhammad Zia-ul-Haq was held in Pakistan on 19 December 1984. Voters were asked whether they supported Zia-ul-Haq's proposals for amending several laws in accordance with the Quran and Sunnah, whether they wanted this process to continue, and whether they supported the Islamic ideology of Pakistan. The referendum also served as  way of extending Zia-ul-Haq's presidential term by five years. Official results declared it approved by 98.5% of voters, with a turnout of 62.2%. Independent observers questioned whether voter participation had reached 30% and noted that there had been "widespread irregularities".

Results

References

1984 referendums
1984 in Pakistan
1984
Muhammad Zia-ul-Haq
Military government of Pakistan (1977–1988)
Islamism in Pakistan
1980s in Islam